Piezogaster calcarator is a species of leaf-footed bug in the family Coreidae. It is found in North America.

References

Articles created by Qbugbot
Insects described in 1803
Nematopodini
Hemiptera of North America